Breweries in Wisconsin produce many different styles of beer.

Some breweries package their beer in bottles or cans for retail sale.  Some breweries produce kegs of beer, to be sold on draft at taverns and restaurants, or at the brewery's own tap room.  Brewpubs combine brewing operations with full-service restaurants.  Commercially licensed breweries use one or several of these methods to sell their products.

Breweries

Other beer companies
Big Bay Brewing Company – Contract brewer formerly out of Milwaukee, now at House of Brews out of Madison.
BluCreek Brewing Company – Madison – Founded in 2000 and originally targeted to a Japanese market.  Produced by Sand Creek Brewing in Black River Falls.
Fauerbach Brewing Company – Madison – Brand revived in 2005 and produced by Gray Brewing Company in Janesville.
Horny Goat – Milwaukee – Founded in 2009. Brewpub and experimental brewing facilities in Milwaukee were open until 2015.  Produced by Stevens Point Brewery.
III Dachshunds Beer Company – Cudahy – Brewing since 2003.  Available only on tap at City Lounge in Cudahy.  Produced by Stone Cellar Brewery in Appleton.
James Page Brewing Company - James Page Brewing was founded in 1986, and much of its beer was produced under contract, by other breweries.  It is currently made by the Stevens Point Brewery.
Lithia Beer – West Bend – Founded in 1898, merged into the West Bend Brewing Company in 1889.  Brand revived in 2008 and is currently produced by Sprecher Brewing Company.
Pangaea Beer Company – Neshkoro – Produced by Sand Creek Brewing in Black River Falls.

Closed breweries
Milwaukee

Pabst Brewing Company (1844–1996) (has since re-opened a brewery in 2017)
Joseph Schlitz Brewing Company (1849–1982)
Valentin Blatz Brewing Company (1851–1959)
Cream City Brewing Company (1853–1937)
A. Gettelman Brewing Company (1856–1961)
Independent Milwaukee Brewery (1901–1964)

Others
John Philips Brewery – Mineral Point (1835) (earliest known brewery in Wisconsin, then known as the Michigan Territory)
Joseph Huber Brewing Company – Monroe (1845–1985)
G. Heileman Brewing Company – La Crosse (1858–1996)
Gambrinus Brewing Co. – Oshkosh (1864–1971)
Ashland Brewing Company – Ashland (1874–1937)
George Walter Brewing Company – Appleton (1885–1972)
Walter Brothers Brewing Company – Menasha (1888–1956)
John Walter Brewing Company – Eau Claire (1893–1990)
Hibernia Brewing – Eau Claire (1985–1988)
Rockhound Brewing Company - Madison (2016-2020)

See also
 Beer in Milwaukee
 Beer in the United States
 Barrel-aged beer

References

External links
 Map of breweries in Wisconsin

Wisconsin
Breweries